The Egypt Cup (also known as Egyptian FA Cup, formerly King Farouk Cup) is the main knockout football cup competition in Egypt.

List of finals
The following table provides a summary of seasons:

Notes:
  The Winner and Runner-up of 1960–61 Egypt Cup qualified for United Arab Republic Cup.
  Title Shared.

Performances

Performance by club

Notes:
  The 1942–43 and 1957–58 titles were shared.

See also 
 Egyptian Premier League
 Egyptian Super Cup
 Sultan Hussein Cup
 List of football clubs in Egypt
 Cairo Derby

References

External links

 RSSSF competition history
 Egypt Cup - Hailoosport.com (Arabic)
 Egypt Cup - Hailoosport.com

 
Cup
Egypt